Felix Monsén (born 6 November 1994) is a Swedish alpine ski racer.

World Cup Results

References

1994 births
Living people
Swedish male alpine skiers
Place of birth missing (living people)
21st-century Swedish people